Rowan D. Wick (born November 9, 1992) is a Canadian professional baseball pitcher for the Chicago Cubs of Major League Baseball (MLB). He previously played for the San Diego Padres.

Career

Amateur
Wick attended Carson Graham Secondary School in North Vancouver, British Columbia, Canada and was drafted by the Milwaukee Brewers in the 19th round of the 2010 MLB draft. He did not sign with the Brewers and attended St. John's University to play college baseball. After one year at St. John's, Wick transferred to Cypress College. He played for the La Crosse Loggers of the summer collegiate Northwoods League during the summer of 2011. He was drafted by the St. Louis Cardinals in the ninth round of the 2012 MLB draft.

St. Louis Cardinals

Wick signed with the Cardinals and started his professional career as a catcher. He made his professional debut in 2012 with the Gulf Coast Cardinals where he batted .156 in 23 games. He gave up 12 passed balls in 12 games.

He played 2013 with the Johnson City Cardinals. He batted .256 with 10 home runs and 35 RBIs in 56 games. He split his time on defense between catcher and right field.

In 2014, Wick switched to the outfield, where he played with the State College Spikes and Peoria Chiefs, compiling a .292 batting average with 20 home runs and 60 RBIs in 74 games between the two teams. He played 64 games in right field and seven games in left field.

In 2015, Wick started the season with the Palm Beach Cardinals. He had a slow start with the bat; batting .198 in 33 games, playing right field. He was transitioned into a pitcher and finished the season with the Gulf Coast Cardinals, giving up two runs in two innings.

In 2016, his first full season as a pitcher, he played for both Palm Beach and the Springfield Cardinals, where he posted a 2–0 record and 2.44 ERA with 20 walks and 57 strikeouts in 44.1 innings pitched out of the bullpen. After the season, the Cardinals assigned Wick to the Glendale Desert Dogs of the Arizona Fall League where he had a 4.50 ERA, and added him to their 40-man roster.

In 2017, Wick began the season with the Memphis Redbirds, but was placed on the disabled list on May 14 and was not reactivated until July 10. After being reactivated, he reported to Springfield. He returned to Memphis in September. In 16 appearances for Springfield, he posted a 2.08 ERA and in 14 appearances for Memphis he was 2–1 with a 5.40 ERA. The Cardinals designated him for assignment.

San Diego Padres
On February 16, 2018, Wick was claimed off waivers by the San Diego Padres. On March 28, 2018, Wick was outrighted off the 40-man roster. He began the season with the San Antonio Missions. On August 31, 2018, he made his MLB debut. 

He was 0–1 with a 6.48 ERA in 10 games for the Padres in 2018.

Chicago Cubs
On November 20, 2018, Wick was traded to the Chicago Cubs in exchange for Jason Vosler. In 2019 for the Cubs, Wick appeared in 31 games, recording a 2–0 record and 2.43 ERA with 16 walks and 35 strikeouts in 33.1 innings pitched. 

In the shortened 2020 season, Wick appeared in 19 games for Chicago, pitching to a 3.12 ERA with 20 strikeouts in 17.1 innings of work. He went on the injured list in September with a left oblique strain.

On April 26, 2021, Wick was placed on the 60-day injured list with a left oblique intercostal strain. He missed the first four months of the season with the injury. On August 10, Wick was activated off of the injured list. He was 0–1 with a 4.30 ERA. Between the South Bend Cubs and the Iowa Cubs, he was 1–0 with a 6.14 ERA.

On November 18, 2022, Wick signed a one-year, $1.55 million contract with the Cubs, avoiding arbitration.

References

External links

1992 births
Living people
Canadian expatriate baseball players in the United States
Chicago Cubs players
Cypress Chargers baseball players
El Paso Chihuahuas players
Glendale Desert Dogs players
Gulf Coast Cardinals players
Johnson City Cardinals players
Major League Baseball pitchers
Major League Baseball players from Canada
Memphis Redbirds players
Palm Beach Cardinals players
Peoria Chiefs players
San Antonio Missions players
San Diego Padres players
Springfield Cardinals players
State College Spikes players
World Baseball Classic players of Canada
2017 World Baseball Classic players
La Crosse Loggers players